This is a list of the bird species recorded on Norfolk Island. The avifauna of Norfolk Island include a total of 186 species.

This list's taxonomic treatment (designation and sequence of orders, families and species) and nomenclature (common and scientific names) follow the conventions of The Clements Checklist of Birds of the World, 2022 edition. The family accounts at the beginning of each heading reflect this taxonomy, as do the species counts found in each family account. Introduced and accidental species are included in the total counts for Norfolk Island.

The following tags have been used to highlight several categories. The commonly occurring native species do not fall into any of these categories.

(A) Accidental - a species that rarely or accidentally occurs on Norfolk Island.
(E) Endemic - a species endemic to Norfolk Island
(I) Introduced - a species introduced to Norfolk Island as a consequence, direct or indirect, of human actions

Ducks, geese, and waterfowl
Order: AnseriformesFamily: Anatidae

Anatidae includes the ducks and most duck-like waterfowl, such as geese and swans. These birds are adapted to an aquatic existence with webbed feet, flattened bills, and feathers that are excellent at shedding water due to an oily coating.

Plumed whistling-duck, Dendrocygna eytoni
Graylag goose, Anser anser (I)
Black swan, Cygnus atratus (A)
Australian shelduck, Tadorna tadornoides (A)
Northern shoveler, Spatula clypeata (A)
Pacific black duck, Anas superciliosa
Mallard, Anas platyrhynchos (I)
Gray teal, Anas gracilis (A)
Hardhead, Aythya australis (A)

New World quail
Order: GalliformesFamily: Odontophoridae

The New World quails are small, plump terrestrial birds only distantly related to the quails of the Old World, but named for their similar appearance and habits.

California quail Callipepla californica (I)

Pheasants, grouse, and allies
Order: GalliformesFamily: Phasianidae

Phasianidae consists of the pheasants and their allies. These are terrestrial species, variable in size but generally plump, with broad, relatively short wings. Many species are gamebirds or have been domesticated as a food source for humans.

Red junglefowl, Gallus gallus (I)

Grebes
Order: PodicipediformesFamily: Podicipedidae

Grebes are small to medium-large freshwater diving birds. They have lobed toes and are excellent swimmers and divers. However, they have their feet placed far back on the body, making them quite ungainly on land.

Australasian grebe, Tachybaptus novaehollandiae (A)

Pigeons and doves
Order: ColumbiformesFamily: Columbidae

Pigeons and doves are stout-bodied birds with short necks and short slender bills with a fleshy cere.

Rock pigeon, Columba livia (I)
Pacific emerald dove, Chalcophaps longirostris  (A)
Norfolk ground dove, Alopecoenas norfolkensis (E) extinct 
Rose-crowned Fruit-dove, Ptilinopus regina (A)
Torresian imperial-pigeon, Ducula spilorrhoa
Topknot pigeon, Lopholaimus antarcticus 
New Zealand pigeon, Hemiphaga novaeseelandiae (Ex)

Cuckoos
Order: CuculiformesFamily: Cuculidae

The family Cuculidae includes cuckoos, roadrunners and anis. These birds are of variable size with slender bodies, long tails and strong legs.

Long-tailed koel, Urodynamis taitensis
Channel-billed cuckoo, Scythrops novaehollandiae (A)
Shining bronze-cuckoo, Chrysococcyx lucidus
Pallid cuckoo, Cacomantis pallidus (A)
Fan-tailed cuckoo, Cacomantis flabelliformis (A)
Oriental cuckoo, Cuculus optatus (A)

Swifts
Order: CaprimulgiformesFamily: Apodidae

Swifts are small birds which spend the majority of their lives flying. These birds have very short legs and never settle voluntarily on the ground, perching instead only on vertical surfaces. Many swifts have long swept-back wings which resemble a crescent or boomerang.

White-throated needletail, Hirundapus caudacutus (A)
Pacific swift, Apus pacificus (A)

Rails, gallinules, and coots
Order: GruiformesFamily: Rallidae

Rallidae is a large family of small to medium-sized birds which includes the rails, crakes, coots and gallinules. Typically they inhabit dense vegetation in damp environments near lakes, swamps or rivers. In general they are shy and secretive birds, making them difficult to observe. Most species have strong legs and long toes which are well adapted to soft uneven surfaces. They tend to have short, rounded wings and to be weak fliers.

Buff-banded rail, Gallirallus philippensis 
Eurasian coot, Fulica atra (A)
Australasian swamphen, Porphyrio melanotus 
Spotless crake, Gallirallus philippensis

Stilts and avocets
Order: CharadriiformesFamily: Recurvirostridae

Recurvirostridae is a family of large wading birds, which includes the avocets and stilts. The avocets have long legs and long up-curved bills. The stilts have extremely long legs and long, thin, straight bills.

Pied stilt, Himantopus leucocephalus (A)
Red-necked avocet, Recurvirostra novaehollandiae (A)

Oystercatchers
Order: CharadriiformesFamily: Haematopodidae

The oystercatchers are large and noisy plover-like birds, with strong bills used for smashing or prising open molluscs.

Pied oystercatcher, Haematopus longirostris (A)
South Island oystercatcher, Haematopus finschi (A)

Plovers and lapwings
Order: CharadriiformesFamily: Charadriidae

The family Charadriidae includes the plovers, dotterels and lapwings. They are small to medium-sized birds with compact bodies, short, thick necks and long, usually pointed, wings. They are found in open country worldwide, mostly in habitats near water.

Pacific golden-plover, Pluvialis fulva
Masked lapwing, Vanellus miles (A)
Lesser sand-plover, Charadrius mongolus 
Greater sand-plover, Charadrius leschenaultii
Double-banded plover, Charadrius bicinctus
Common ringed plover, Charadrius hiaticula (A)
Oriental plover, Charadrius veredus (A)

Sandpipers and allies
Order: CharadriiformesFamily: Scolopacidae

Scolopacidae is a large diverse family of small to medium-sized shorebirds including the sandpipers, curlews, godwits, shanks, tattlers, woodcocks, snipes, dowitchers and phalaropes. The majority of these species eat small invertebrates picked out of the mud or soil. Variation in length of legs and bills enables multiple species to feed in the same habitat, particularly on the coast, without direct competition for food.

Bristle-thighed curlew, Numenius tahitiensis (A)
Whimbrel, Numenius phaeopus 
Little curlew, Numenius minutus (A)
Far Eastern curlew, Numenius madagascariensis (A)
Bar-tailed godwit, Limosa lapponica 
Black-tailed godwit, Limosa limosa (A) 
Hudsonian godwit, Limosa haemastica (A) 
Ruddy turnstone, Arenaria interpres
Red knot, Calidris canutus 
Sharp-tailed sandpiper, Calidris acuminata 
Curlew sandpiper, Calidris ferruginea
Red-necked stint, Tringa incana 
Sanderling, Calidris alba 
Pectoral sandpiper, Calidris melanotos (A) 
Latham's snipe, Gallinago hardwickii (A)
Terek sandpiper, Xenus cinereus  
Common sandpiper, Actitis hypoleucos  (A)
Gray-tailed tattler, Tringa brevipes 
Wandering tattler, Tringa incana 
Common greenshank, Tringa nebularia 
Marsh sandpiper, Tringa stagnatilis

Pratincoles and coursers
Order: CharadriiformesFamily: Glareolidae

Glareolidae is a family of wading birds comprising the pratincoles, which have short legs, long pointed wings and long forked tails, and the coursers, which have long legs, short wings and long, pointed bills which curve downwards.

Oriental pratincole, Glareola maldivarum (A)

Skuas and jaegers
Order: CharadriiformesFamily: Stercorariidae

The family Stercorariidae are, in general, medium to large birds, typically with grey or brown plumage, often with white markings on the wings. They nest on the ground in temperate and arctic regions and are long-distance migrants.

South Polar skua, Stercorarius maccormicki (A)
Brown skua, Stercorarius antarcticus (A)
Pomarine jaeger, Stercorarius pomarinus (A) 
Parasitic jaeger, Stercorarius parasiticus (A)
Long-tailed jaeger, Stercorarius longicaudus (A)

Gulls, terns, and skimmers
Order: CharadriiformesFamily: Laridae

Laridae is a family of medium to large seabirds, the gulls, terns, and skimmers. Gulls are typically grey or white, often with black markings on the head or wings. They have stout, longish bills and webbed feet. Terns are a group of generally medium to large seabirds typically with grey or white plumage, often with black markings on the head. Most terns hunt fish by diving but some pick insects off the surface of fresh water. Terns are generally long-lived birds, with several species known to live in excess of 30 years.

Silver gull, Chroicocephalus novaehollandiae (A)
Laughing gull, Leucophaeus atricilla (A)
Kelp gull, Larus dominicanus (A)
Brown noddy, Anous stolidus
Black noddy, Anous minutus
Gray noddy, Anous albivitta
White tern, Gygis alba 
Sooty tern, Onychoprion fuscatus 
Bridled tern, Onychoprion anaethetus 
Little tern, Sternula albifrons (A)
Australian fairy tern, Sternula nereis (A)
White-winged tern, Chlidonias leucopterus (A)
Whiskered tern, Chlidonias hybrida (A)
Roseate tern, Sterna dougallii
White-fronted tern, Sterna striata  (A)
Great crested tern, Thalasseus bergii (A)

Tropicbirds
Order: PhaethontiformesFamily: Phaethontidae

Tropicbirds are slender white birds of tropical oceans, with exceptionally long central tail feathers. Their long wings have black markings, as does the head.

White-tailed tropicbird, Phaethon lepturus (A)
Red-tailed tropicbird, Phaethon rubricauda

Albatrosses
Order: ProcellariiformesFamily: Diomedeidae

The albatrosses are among the largest of flying birds, and the great albatrosses from the genus Diomedea have the largest wingspans of any extant birds.

Yellow-nosed albatross, Thalassarche chlororhynchos
White-capped albatross, Thalassarche cauta
Chatham albatross, Thalassarche eremita (A)
Black-browed albatross, Thalassarche melanophris (A)
Wandering albatross, Diomedea exulans (A)
Laysan albatross, Phoebastria immutabilis (A)

Southern storm-petrels
Order: ProcellariiformesFamily: Oceanitidae

The southern storm-petrels are relatives of the petrels and are the smallest seabirds. They feed on planktonic crustaceans and small fish picked from the surface, typically while hovering. The flight is fluttering and sometimes bat-like.

Wilson's storm-petrel, Oceanites oceanicus (A)
White-faced storm-petrel, Pelagodroma marina (Ex)
White-bellied storm-petrel, Fregetta grallaria
Black-bellied storm-petrel, Fregetta tropica
Polynesian storm-petrel, Nesofregetta fuliginosa (A)

Shearwaters and petrels
Order: ProcellariiformesFamily: Procellariidae

The procellariids are the main group of medium-sized "true petrels", characterised by united nostrils with medium septum and a long outer functional primary.

Southern giant-petrel, Macronectes giganteus (A)
Northern giant-petrel, Macronectes halli
Cape petrel, Daption capense 
Gray-faced petrel, Pterodroma gouldi (A)
Kermadec petrel, Pterodroma neglecta
Providence petrel, Pterodroma solandri
Mottled petrel, Pterodroma inexpectata (A)
White-necked petrel, Pterodroma cervicalis 
Black-winged petrel, Pterodroma nigripennis
Cook's petrel, Pterodroma cookii (A)
Gould's petrel, Pterodroma leucoptera (A)
Collared petrel, Pterodroma brevipes (A)
Pycroft's petrel, Pterodroma pycrofti (A)
Vanuatu petrel, Pterodroma occulta (A)
Fairy prion, Pachyptila turtur (A)
Slender-billed prion, Pachyptila belcheri
Tahiti petrel, 	Pseudobulweria rostrata (A)
White-chinned petrel, Procellaria aequinoctialis (A)
Parkinson's petrel, Procellaria parkinsoni
Flesh-footed shearwater, Ardenna carneipes 
Wedge-tailed shearwater, Ardenna pacifica
Buller's shearwater, Ardenna bulleri  
Sooty shearwater, Ardenna grisea (A) 
Short-tailed shearwater, Ardenna tenuirostris (A)
Newell's shearwater, Puffinus newelli (A)
Fluttering shearwater, Puffinus gavia 
Little shearwater, Puffinus assimilis
Common diving-petrel, Pelecanoides urinatrix

Frigatebirds
Order: SuliformesFamily: Fregatidae

Frigatebirds are large seabirds usually found over tropical oceans. They are large, black, or black-and-white, with long wings and deeply forked tails. The males have coloured inflatable throat pouches. They do not swim or walk and cannot take off from a flat surface. Having the largest wingspan-to-body-weight ratio of any bird, they are essentially aerial, able to stay aloft for more than a week.

Lesser frigatebird, Fregata ariel 
Great frigatebird, Fregata minor

Boobies and gannets
Order: SuliformesFamily: Sulidae

The sulids comprise the gannets and boobies. Both groups are medium-large coastal seabirds that plunge-dive for fish.

Masked booby, Sula dactylatra
Brown booby, Sula leucogaster 
Red-footed booby, Sula sula (A) 
Australasian gannet, Morus serrator

Cormorants and shags
Order: SuliformesFamily: Phalacrocoracidae

Phalacrocoracidae is a family of medium to large coastal, fish-eating seabirds that includes cormorants and shags. Plumage colouration varies, with the majority having mainly dark plumage, some species being black-and-white and a few being colourful.

Little pied cormorant, Microcarbo melanoleucos (A)
Great cormorant, Phalacrocorax carbo (A)
Little black cormorant, 	Phalacrocorax sulcirostris (A)

Pelicans
Order: PelecaniformesFamily: Pelecanidae

Pelicans are large water birds with distinctive pouches under their bills. Like other birds in the order Pelecaniformes, they have four webbed toes.

Australian pelican, Pelecanus conspicillatus (A)

Herons, egrets, and bitterns
Order: PelecaniformesFamily: Ardeidae

The family Ardeidae contains the bitterns, herons and egrets. Herons and egrets are medium to large wading birds with long necks and legs. Bitterns tend to be shorter necked and more wary. Members of Ardeidae fly with their necks retracted, unlike other long-necked birds such as storks, ibises and spoonbills.

Pacific heron, Ardea pacifica' (A)' 
Great egret, Ardea alba (A)
Intermediate egret, Ardea intermedia (A) 
White-faced heron, Egretta novaehollandiae 
Little egret, Egretta garzetta (A) 
Cattle egret, Bubulcus ibis  (A)

Ibises and spoonbills
Order: PelecaniformesFamily: Threskiornithidae

Threskiornithidae is a family of large terrestrial and wading birds which includes the ibises and spoonbills. They have long, broad wings with 11 primary and about 20 secondary feathers. They are strong fliers and despite their size and weight, very capable soarers.

Glossy ibis, Plegadis falcinellusAustralian ibis, Threskiornis molucca (A) 
Straw-necked ibis, Plegadis falcinellus (A) 
Royal spoonbill, Platalea regia (A) 
Yellow-billed spoonbill, Platalea flavipes (A)

Hawks, eagles, and kites 
Order: AccipitriformesFamily: Accipitridae

Accipitridae is a family of birds of prey, which includes hawks, eagles, kites, harriers and Old World vultures. These birds have powerful hooked beaks for tearing flesh from their prey, strong legs, powerful talons and keen eyesight.

Swamp harrier, Circus approximans 
Brown goshawk, Accipiter fasciatus (A)

Barn-owls
Order: StrigiformesFamily: Tytonidae

Barn-owls are medium to large owls with large heads and characteristic heart-shaped faces. They have long strong legs with powerful talons.

Barn owl, Tyto alba (A)

Owls
Order: StrigiformesFamily: Strigidae

The typical owls are small to large solitary nocturnal birds of prey. They have large forward-facing eyes and ears, a hawk-like beak and a conspicuous circle of feathers around each eye called a facial disk.

Morepork, Ninox novaeseelandiaeKingfishers
Order: CoraciiformesFamily: Alcedinidae

Kingfishers are medium-sized birds with large heads, long, pointed bills, short legs and stubby tails.

Forest kingfisher, Todiramphus macleayii (A)
Sacred kingfisher, Todiramphus sanctusRollers
Order: CoraciiformesFamily: Coraciidae

Rollers resemble crows in size and build, but are more closely related to the kingfishers and bee-eaters. They share the colourful appearance of those groups with blues and browns predominating. The two inner front toes are connected, but the outer toe is not.

Dollarbird, Eurystomus orientalis (A)

Falcons and caracaras
Order: FalconiformesFamily: Falconidae

Falconidae is a family of diurnal birds of prey. They differ from hawks, eagles, and kites in that they kill with their beaks instead of their talons.

Nankeen kestrel, Falco cenchroidesNew Zealand parrots
Order: PsittaciformesFamily: Strigopidae

The New Zealand parrot superfamily, Strigopoidea, consists of at least three genera of parrots – Nestor, Strigops, the fossil Nelepsittacus, and probably the fossil Heracles. The genus Nestor consists of the kea, kaka, Norfolk Island kaka and Chatham Island kaka, while the genus Strigops contains the iconic kakapo. All extant species are endemic to New Zealand. The species of the genus Nelepsittacus were endemics of the main islands, while the two extinct species of the genus Nestor were found at the nearby oceanic islands such as Chatham Island of New Zealand, and Norfolk Island and adjacent Phillip Island.
 
 Norfolk Island kaka, Nestor productus (E) extinct

Old World parrots
Order: PsittaciformesFamily: Psittaculidae

Characteristic features of parrots include a strong curved bill, an upright stance, strong legs, and clawed zygodactyl feet. Many parrots are vividly colored, and some are multi-colored. Old World parrots are found from Africa east across south and southeast Asia and Oceania to Australia and New Zealand.

Norfolk Island parakeet, Cyanoramphus cookii (E)
Crimson rosella, Platycercus elegans (I)
Scaly-breasted lorikeet, Trichoglossus chlorolepidotus (A)

Thornbills and allies
Order: PasseriformesFamily: Acanthizidae

Thornbills are small passerine birds, similar in habits to the tits.

Norfolk Island gerygone, Gerygone modestaCuckooshrikes
Order: PasseriformesFamily: Campephagidae

The cuckooshrikes are small to medium-sized passerine birds. They are predominantly greyish with white and black, although some species are brightly coloured.

Black-faced cuckooshrike, Coracina novaehollandiae (A)

Whistlers and allies
Order: PasseriformesFamily: Pachycephalidae

The family Pachycephalidae includes the whistlers, shrikethrushes, and some of the pitohuis.

Golden whistler, Pachycephala pectoralisWoodswallows, bellmagpies, and allies
Order: PasseriformesFamily: Artamidae

The woodswallows are soft-plumaged, somber-coloured passerine birds. They are smooth, agile flyers with moderately large, semi-triangular wings. The cracticids: currawongs, bellmagpies and butcherbirds, are similar to the other corvids. They have large, straight bills and mostly black, white or grey plumage. All are omnivorous to some degree.

Masked woodswallow, Artamus personatus (A) 
White-browed woodswallow, Artamus superciliosus (A)

Fantails
Order: PasseriformesFamily: Rhipiduridae

The fantails are small insectivorous birds which are specialist aerial feeders.
 
Gray fantail, Rhipidura albiscapaAustralasian robins
Order: PasseriformesFamily: Petroicidae

Most species of Petroicidae have a stocky build with a large rounded head, a short straight bill and rounded wingtips. They occupy a wide range of wooded habitats, from subalpine to tropical rainforest, and mangrove swamp to semi-arid scrubland. All are primarily insectivores, although a few supplement their diet with seeds.

Norfolk robin, Petroica multicolorSwallows
Order: PasseriformesFamily: Hirundinidae

The family Hirundinidae is adapted to aerial feeding. They have a slender streamlined body, long pointed wings, and a short bill with a wide gape. The feet are adapted to perching rather than walking, and the front toes are partially joined at the base.

Welcome swallow, Hirundo neoxenaWhite-eyes, yuhinas, and allies
Order: PasseriformesFamily: Zosteropidae

The white-eyes are small birds of rather drab appearance, the plumage above being typically greenish-olive, but some species have a white or bright yellow throat, breast, or lower parts, and several have buff flanks. As the name suggests, many species have a white ring around each eye.
 
Silver-eye, Zosterops lateralisSlender-billed white-eye, Zosterops tenuirostrisStarlings
Order: PasseriformesFamily: Sturnidae

Starlings are small to medium-sized passerine birds. Their flight is strong and direct and they are very gregarious. Their preferred habitat is fairly open country. They eat insects and fruit. Plumage is typically dark with a metallic sheen.

European starling, Sturnus vulgaris (I)

Thrushes and allies
Order: PasseriformesFamily: Turdidae

The thrushes are a group of passerine birds that occur mainly in the Old World. They are plump, soft plumaged, small to medium-sized insectivores or sometimes omnivores, often feeding on the ground. Many have attractive songs.

Song thrush, Turdus philomelos (I)
Eurasian blackbird, Turdus merula (I)

Old World sparrows
Order: PasseriformesFamily: Passeridae

Old World sparrows are small passerine birds, typically small, plump, brown or grey with short tails and short powerful beaks. They are seed-eaters, but also consume small insects.

House sparrow, Passer domesticus (I)

Finches, euphonias, and allies
Order: PasseriformesFamily: Fringillidae

Finches are small to moderately large seed-eating passerine birds with a strong beak, usually conical and in some species very large. All have 12 tail feathers and nine primary flight feathers. Finches have a bouncing flight, alternating bouts of flapping with gliding on closed wings, and most sing well.

Common chaffinch, Fringilla coelebs (A)
European greenfinch, Chloris chloris (I)
Common redpoll, Acanthis flammea  (I)
Lesser redpoll, 	Acanthis cabaret (I)
European goldfinch, Carduelis carduelis'' (I)

See also
List of birds
Lists of birds by region

References

Norfolk Island